Online speech therapy or telepractice is the use of technology to provide speech therapy via high speed internet, webcam, headset with microphone or any other form of communication. Online therapy is a clinical arrangement where the patient and a speech-language certified pathologist communicate and interact face-to-face over the Internet. The session involves a suite of therapeutic exercises including listening, speaking, reading and writing. The recorded videos are assessed by the pathologist to generate an activity report for evaluating progress and usage.

Telepractice is a method of reaching students and individuals in any distant location. Telepractice is defined by the American Speech–Language–Hearing Association (ASHA) as the use of technology to provide speech therapy services to remote regions. Janet Brown, the Director of Healthcare services in SLP at ASHA has stated "research shows that with telepractice a speech-language pathologist can provide speech therapy services, with the same results, as being there in person."

Assessment
Assessment for online speech therapy consists of an informal oral exam by a licensed trained professional through video conferencing or a web application. Patients are initially screened for communication disorders with diagnosis and consultation for provision counseling including cognitive aspects of communication, syntax, hypophonia and upper aerodigestive functions. The therapist and patient communicate via telecommunication technology where they can interact in real time. Therapy may cover speech sound production, fluency, language, cognition and written language.

The therapists create an assessment document or report that is updated after every session. The document is reported to the parents or the referral source. In the United States, this is required for compliance with the Health Insurance Portability and Accountability Act (HIPAA) and the Family Educational Rights and Privacy Act (FERPA). The laws serve to protect health information and student records. Clinical departments in Universities also offer speech and language therapy services where they keep recorded video of sessions between clinicians and patients secured through password security services.

Course
Online speech therapy courses are offered by professional associations, Universities and cyber schools for treatment of communication disorders. The minimum eligibility for an online speech therapy course is a bachelor's degree for Master's entry-level field and master's degree for CScD offered by professional associations and Universities in the United States. The speech therapist course is not available for Bachelors or undergraduate degree level in the United States. The pathologists are required to attain a minimum of 400 clinical hours to complete the course. In Asian countries, the course is open for Bachelors level degree program offered by Universities.

Speech Pathologist are also required to complete 400 hours clinical hours and pass the KASA exams in the United States.

References

Speech and language pathology
Telemedicine